Cormier Woods is a  open space preserve and historic 18th-century farm complex in Uxbridge, Massachusetts, USA, within the Blackstone River Valley National Heritage Corridor. The property is named for James Cormier, the former owner of the property. It was acquired in 2008 by the land conservation non-profit organization The Trustees of Reservations.

The reservation includes  of hiking trails, farmland, woodlots, wetlands, a farmhouse, barn and sheds. It is open to hiking, picnicking, cross country skiing and hunting (in season). The reservation trailhead is on Chapin Street in Uxbridge.

References

External links
The Trustees of Reservations
Cormier Woods trail map

Protected areas of Worcester County, Massachusetts
The Trustees of Reservations
Farms in Massachusetts
Open space reserves of Massachusetts
Buildings and structures in Uxbridge, Massachusetts
Uxbridge, Massachusetts
Protected areas established in 2008
2008 establishments in Massachusetts